In enzymology, a GDP-mannose 6-dehydrogenase is an enzyme that catalyzes the chemical reaction

GDP-D-mannose + 2 NAD+ + H2O  GDP-D-mannuronate + 2 NADH + 2 H+

The 3 substrates of this enzyme are GDP-D-mannose, NAD+, and H2O, whereas its 3 products are GDP-D-mannuronate, NADH, and H+.

This enzyme belongs to the family of oxidoreductases, specifically those acting on the CH-OH group of donor with NAD+ or NADP+ as acceptor. The systematic name of this enzyme class is GDP-D-mannose:NAD+ 6-oxidoreductase. Other names in common use include guanosine diphosphomannose dehydrogenase, GDP-mannose dehydrogenase, guanosine diphosphomannose dehydrogenase, and guanosine diphospho-D-mannose dehydrogenase. This enzyme participates in fructose and mannose metabolism.

This protein may use the morpheein model of allosteric regulation.

Structural studies

References

Further reading 

 

EC 1.1.1
NADH-dependent enzymes
Enzymes of known structure